General Lord Robert Manners (c. 1721 – 31 May 1782) was an English soldier and nobleman. He was a son of John Manners, 2nd Duke of Rutland and his second wife, Lucy Sherard.

Life
He purchased an ensigncy in the Coldstream Guards on 26 July 1735, and was promoted lieutenant in May 1740. On 22 April 1742, he was promoted captain and lieutenant-colonel in the 1st Foot Guards, and in December 1747, colonel and aide-de-camp to King George II. Manners was returned as Member of Parliament for Kingston upon Hull in 1747, and kept the seat for the remainder of his life. In September 1748, he was appointed colonel of the 15th Light Dragoons, which were shortly thereafter disbanded. On 13 March 1751 he was made colonel of the 36th Regiment of Foot, and was promoted major-general on 7 February 1757, and lieutenant-general on 7 April 1759. He was transferred to the colonelcy of the 3rd (The Prince of Wales's) Dragoon Guards on 6 September 1765. He was promoted general on 25 May 1772 and died on 31 May 1782.

On 1 January 1756 he married Mary Digges (c. 1727–1829), by whom he had several children:
Mary Manners (1756–1834), married on 31 January 1777 William Hamilton Nisbet (1747–1822)
General Robert Manners (1758–1823), had five children by his mistress, Mary Ann Goodchild (1780–1854)
John James Manners (1762–1763)
George Manners (1763–1828), of Bloxholm and Ufford Hall, unmarried
Lucy Manners (1764–1835), unmarried

General Robert Manners left Bloxholm to his brother George, High Sheriff of Lincolnshire in 1826, whose death occurred in 1828.  Both brothers having died unmarried, George left the estate to their dearest cousin, Mrs Jenney.  She was the daughter of John, second Duke of Rutland, and sister of Lord Robert Manners, the father of Robert and George, making her their first cousin, once removed.  However, Lady Mary Bruce (her husband being Robert Nisbet-Hamilton who changed his surname from Christopher) who was the brothers’ great niece, and eldest daughter of the 7th Earl of Elgin, contested the will, saying George had changed his will in her favour, and took the matter to court.  A relative of the brothers wrote to the Editor of the Stamford Mercury on 26 March 1841 making it very clear that the family knew George wanted Bloxholm to go to Mrs Jenney, writing: for it is the opinion of all who are acquainted with the circumstances, that the testator would never have made an alteration had he been in the full possession of his faculties. The  matter was settled in favour of Lady Mary Bruce.

References

Descendants of Sir Robert de Manners, of Etal
General Lord Robert Manners
regiments.org

 John Brooke, MANNERS, Lord Robert (?1717-82), of Bloxholm, Lincs. in The History of Parliament: the House of Commons 1754-1790 (1964)
 Romney Sedgwick, MANNERS, Lord Robert (c.1717-82), of Bloxholm, Lincs. in The History of Parliament: the House of Commons 1715-1754 (1970)

1720s births
1782 deaths
Members of the Parliament of Great Britain for English constituencies
British MPs 1747–1754
British MPs 1754–1761
British MPs 1761–1768
British MPs 1768–1774
British MPs 1774–1780
British MPs 1780–1784
British Army generals
Younger sons of dukes
36th Regiment of Foot officers
R
Sherard family
Coldstream Guards officers
Grenadier Guards officers
3rd Dragoon Guards officers
18th-century English people
18th-century British Army personnel